Coquillettia mimetica is a species of plant bug in the family Miridae. It is found in North America.

Subspecies
These three subspecies belong to the species Coquillettia mimetica:
 Coquillettia mimetica floridana Knight, 1927
 Coquillettia mimetica laticeps Knight, 1927
 Coquillettia mimetica mimetica Osborn, 1898

References

Further reading

 

Phylinae
Articles created by Qbugbot
Insects described in 1898